James Earl Rudder High School is a public high school located in Bryan, Texas (United States). It is part of the Bryan Independent School District. The school enrollment is more than 1,300 students. In 2015, the school was rated "Met Standard" by the Texas Education Agency.

In addition to portions of Bryan, the school's attendance boundary includes Kurten, Lake Bryan, and Wixon Valley.

About
James Earl Rudder High School is named after James Earl Rudder who was a highly decorated World War II soldier. His honors include the Distinguished Service Cross, Legion of Merit, Silver Star, French Legion of Honor, and others.

While lieutenant colonel of the 2nd Ranger Battalion, he led the group up 100 ft. cliffs on a beach in Normandy on D-Day. After the war, Rudder served as mayor of Brady, Texas from 1946-1952. In 1955 he was appointed State Land Commissioner, where he worked to “increase the permanent endowments for public schools and universities.” Afterwards he became the president of Texas A&M College (now known as Texas A&M University) in 1959, located in neighboring College Station, Texas. While president, he was instrumental in allowing women to attend the university.

History
Bryan Independent School District decided to build the new high school mainly because of overcrowding at Bryan High School. The funding came from a $104 million bond agreement. Before the campus was built, 300 James Earl Rudder High School students attended Bryan High School's campus for the first year of the campus’ completion, and their core classes were taught by new, Rudder teachers.  Hon. Chet Edwards of the House of Representatives attended the school's dedication.

FineArts
Rudder High School has a large variety of fine art and career paths to join. The students can go to competition for these courses in SkillsUSA, and Technology Skill Association (TSA) to demonstrate their skills and get recognition. 

Graphic Design
Photography
Game Design
Welding
Construction
Cosmetology
Art
Choir
Band
Dance
Orchestra
Theatre

Athletics
The James Earl Rudder High School mascot is the Ranger. The Rangers compete in these sports - 

Baseball
Basketball
Cross Country
Football
Golf
Gymnastics
Powerlifting
Soccer
Softball
Tennis
Track and Field
Volleyball 
Wrestling

Football
The school has a District 18-5A football program and shares a football stadium with Bryan High School. Recent renovations to the football stadium include a $1.1 million Matrix turf  with an 11,000 seat capacity.

Gymnastics
The Rudder Boys Gymnastics Team has won a state championship title two times in three years (2013-2016).

References

External links
Official Website
Rudder HS Twitter

High schools in Brazos County, Texas
Public high schools in Texas
Bryan, Texas